Charles I or Karl I (17 August 18871 April 1922) was Emperor of Austria, King of Hungary (as Charles IV), King of Croatia, King of Bohemia (as Charles III), and the last of the monarchs belonging to the House of Habsburg-Lorraine to rule over Austria-Hungary. The son of Archduke Otto of Austria and Princess Maria Josepha of Saxony, Charles became heir presumptive of Emperor Franz Joseph when his uncle Archduke Franz Ferdinand of Austria was assassinated in 1914. In 1911, he married Princess Zita of Bourbon-Parma. He is venerated in the Catholic Church, having been beatified by Pope John Paul II on 3 October 2004, and is known to the Catholic Church as Blessed Karl of Austria.

Charles succeeded to the thrones in November 1916 following the death of his grand-uncle, Franz Joseph. He began secret negotiations with the Allies, hoping to peacefully end the First World War but was unsuccessful. Despite Charles's efforts to preserve the empire by returning it to federalism and by championing Austro-Slavism, Austria-Hungary hurtled into disintegration: Czechoslovakia and the State of Slovenes, Croats and Serbs were proclaimed, and Hungary broke monarchic ties to Austria by the end of October 1918. Following the Armistice of 11 November 1918, Charles "renounced participation" in state affairs, but did not abdicate. The Republic of German-Austria was proclaimed the following day, and in April 1919 the Austrian Parliament formally dethroned the Habsburgs and banished Charles from the German-Austrian Republic for life.

Charles spent the early part of his exile in Switzerland. He spent the remaining years of his life attempting to restore the monarchy. He made two attempts to reclaim the Hungarian throne in 1921; but failed due to the opposition of Hungary's Calvinist regent Admiral Miklós Horthy. Charles was exiled for a second time to the Portuguese island of Madeira, where he soon fell ill and died of respiratory failure in 1922.

Early life

Charles was born on 17 August 1887, in the Castle of Persenbeug, in Lower Austria. His parents were Archduke Otto Franz of Austria and Princess Maria Josepha of Saxony. At the time, his grand-uncle Franz Joseph reigned as Emperor of Austria and King of Hungary. Upon the death of Crown Prince Rudolph in 1889, the Emperor's brother, Archduke Karl Ludwig, Charles’ grandfather, was next in line to the Austro-Hungarian throne. However, his death in 1896 from typhoid made his eldest son, Archduke Franz Ferdinand, the new heir presumptive.

Archduke Charles was reared a devout Catholic. He spent his early years wherever his father's regiment happened to be stationed; later on, he lived in Vienna and Reichenau an der Rax. He was privately educated, but, contrary to the custom ruling in the imperial family, he attended a public gymnasium (the Schottengymnasium) for the sake of demonstrations in scientific subjects. On the conclusion of his studies at the gymnasium, he entered the army, spending the years from 1906 to 1908 as an officer chiefly in Prague, where he studied Law and Political Science concurrently with his military duties.

In 1907, he was declared of age, and Prince Zdenko von Lobkowitz was appointed as his chamberlain. During the next few years, he carried out his military duties in various Bohemian garrison towns. Charles's relations with his grand-uncle were not intimate, and those with his uncle Franz Ferdinand were not cordial, with the differences between their wives increasing the existing tension between them. For these reasons, Charles, up to the time of the assassination of his uncle in 1914, obtained no insight into affairs of state, but led the life of a prince not destined for a high political position.

Marriage 

In 1911, Charles married Princess Zita of Bourbon-Parma. They had met as children but did not see one another for almost ten years, as each pursued their education. In 1909, his dragoon regiment was stationed at Brandýs nad Labem in Bohemia, from where he visited his aunt at Franzensbad.

It was during one of these visits that Charles and Zita became reacquainted. Due to Franz Ferdinand's morganatic marriage in 1900, his children were excluded from the succession. As a result, the Emperor pressured Charles to marry. Zita not only shared Charles's devout Catholicism, but also an impeccable royal lineage. Zita later recalled:

Archduke Charles traveled to Villa Pianore, the Italian winter residence of Zita's parents, and asked for her hand; on 13 June 1911, their engagement was announced at the Austrian court. Charles and Zita were married at the Bourbon-Parma castle of Schwarzau in Austria on 21 October 1911. Charles's grand-uncle, the 81-year-old Emperor Franz Joseph, attended the wedding. He was relieved to see the second-in-line to the throne in a suitable marriage, and was in good spirits, even leading the toast at the wedding breakfast. Archduchess Zita soon conceived a son, and Otto was born 20 November 1912. Seven more children followed in the next decade.

Heir presumptive
Charles (his father having died in 1906) became heir presumptive after the assassination of Archduke Franz Ferdinand (his uncle) in Sarajevo in 1914, the event which precipitated World War I. Only at this time did the old Emperor take steps to initiate the heir-presumptive to his crown in affairs of state. But the outbreak of World War I interfered with this political education. Charles spent his time during the first phase of the war at headquarters at Teschen, but exercised no military influence.

Charles then became a Feldmarschall (Field Marshal) in the Austro-Hungarian Army. In the spring of 1916, in connection with the offensive against Italy, he was entrusted with the command of the XX. Corps, whose affections the heir-presumptive to the throne won by his affability and friendliness. The offensive, after a successful start, soon came to a standstill. Shortly afterwards, Charles went to the eastern front as commander of an army operating against the Russians and Romanians.

Reign

Charles succeeded to the thrones on 21 November 1916 upon the death of his grand-uncle, Emperor Franz Joseph. On 2 December 1916, he assumed the title of Supreme Commander of the Austro-Hungarian Army, succeeding Archduke Friedrich. His coronation as King of Hungary occurred on 30 December. In 1917, Charles secretly entered into peace negotiations with the Third French Republic. He employed his brother-in-law, Prince Sixtus of Bourbon-Parma, an officer in the Belgian Army, as intermediary. However, the Allies insisted on Austrian recognition of Italian claims to territory and Charles refused, so no progress was made. Foreign minister Graf Czernin was only interested in negotiating a general peace which would include Germany; Charles himself went much further in suggesting his willingness to make a separate peace. When news of the overture leaked in April 1918, Charles denied involvement until French Prime Minister Georges Clemenceau published letters signed by him. This led to Czernin's resignation, forcing Austria-Hungary to give Berlin full control of its armed forces, factories, and railways.

The Austro-Hungarian Empire was wrecked by inner turmoil in the final years of the war, with escalating tension between ethnic groups. As part of his Fourteen Points, U.S. President Woodrow Wilson demanded that the Empire allow for autonomy and self-determination of its peoples. In response, Charles agreed to reconvene the Imperial Parliament and allow for the creation of a confederation with each national group exercising self-governance. However, the ethnic groups fought for full autonomy as separate nations, as they were now determined to become independent from Vienna at the earliest possible moment.

The new foreign minister Baron Istvan Burián asked for an armistice on 14 October based on the Fourteen Points, and two days later Charles issued a proclamation that radically changed the nature of the Austrian state. The Poles were granted full independence with the purpose of joining their ethnic brethren in Russia and Germany in what was to become the Second Polish Republic. The rest of the Austrian lands were transformed into a federal union composed of four parts: German, Czech, South Slav, and Ukrainian. Each of the four parts was to be governed by a federal council, and Trieste was to have a special status. However, U.S. Secretary of State Robert Lansing replied four days later that the Allies were committed to the political independence of the Czechs, Slovaks and South Slavs, and that autonomy inside the Empire was no longer enough. In fact, a Czechoslovak provisional government had joined the Allies on 14 October, and the South Slav national council declared an independent South Slav state on 29 October 1918.

Trialism and Croatia

From the beginning of his reign, Charles l favored the creation of a third Croatian political entity in the Empire, in addition to Austria and Hungary. In his Croatian coronation oath in 1916, he recognized the union of the Triune Kingdom of Croatia, Dalmatia and Slavonia with Rijeka and during his short reign supported trialist suggestions from the Croatian Sabor and Ban; however, the suggestions were always vetoed by the Hungarian Parliament, which did not want to share power with other nations. After Emperor Charles's manifesto of 14 October 1918 was rejected by the declaration of the National Council in Zagreb, President of the Croatian pro-monarchy political party Pure Party of Rights Dr.  with other parliament members and generals went to visit the emperor on 21 October 1918 in Bad Ischl, where the emperor agreed and signed the trialist manifesto under the proposed terms set by the delegation, on the condition that the Hungarian part does the same since he swore an oath on the integrity of the Hungarian crown. The delegation went the next day to Budapest where it presented the manifesto to Hungarian officials and Council of Ministers who signed the manifesto and released the king from his oath, creating a third Croatian political entity (Zvonimir's kingdom). After the signing, two parades were held in Zagreb, one for the ending of the K.u.K. monarchy, which was held in front of the Croatian National Theater, and another one for saving the trialist monarchy. The last vote for the support of the trialist reorganization of the empire was, however, too late. On 29 October 1918, the Croatian Sabor (parliament) ended the union and all ties with Hungary and Austria, proclaimed the unification of all Croatian lands and entered the State of Slovenes, Croats and Serbs. The curiosity is that no act of Sabor dethroned King Charles IV, nor did it acknowledge the entering in a state union with Serbia, which is today mentioned in the preamble of the Constitution of Croatia.

The Lansing note effectively ended any efforts to keep the Empire together. One by one, the nationalities proclaimed their independence; even before the note the national councils had been acting more like provisional governments. Charles's political future became uncertain.  On 31 October, Hungary officially ended the personal union between Austria and Hungary. Nothing remained of Charles's realm except the predominantly German-speaking Danubian and Alpine provinces, and he was challenged even there by the German Austrian State Council. His last Austrian prime minister, Heinrich Lammasch, advised him that he was in an impossible situation, and his best course was to temporarily give up his right to exercise sovereign power.

Proclamations of November 1918 

On the day of the Armistice of 11 November 1918, Charles issued a carefully worded proclamation in which he recognized the Austrian people's right to determine the form of the state and "relinquish[ed] every participation in the administration of the State." He also released his officials from their oath of loyalty to him. On the same day, the Imperial Family left Schönbrunn Palace and moved to Schloss Eckartsau, east of Vienna. On 13 November, following a visit with Hungarian magnates, Charles issued a similar proclamation—the Eckartsau Proclamation—for Hungary.

Although it has widely been cited as an "abdication", the word itself was never used in either proclamation. Indeed, he deliberately avoided using the word abdication in the hope that the people of either Austria or Hungary would vote to recall him. Privately, Charles left no doubt that he believed himself to be the rightful emperor. He wrote to Friedrich Gustav Piffl, the Archbishop of Vienna:

Instead, on 12 November, the day after he issued his proclamation, the independent Republic of German-Austria was proclaimed, followed by the proclamation of the First Hungarian Republic on 16 November. An uneasy truce-like situation ensued and persisted until 23 to 24 March 1919, when Charles left for Switzerland, escorted by the commander of the small British guard detachment at Eckartsau, Lieutenant Colonel Edward Lisle Strutt.

As the imperial train left Austria on 24 March, Charles issued another proclamation in which he confirmed his claim of sovereignty, declaring that: 

The newly established republican government of Austria was not aware of this "Manifesto of Feldkirch" at this time—it had been dispatched only to King Alfonso XIII of Spain and to Pope Benedict XV through diplomatic channels—and politicians in power were irritated by the Emperor's departure without explicit abdication.

The Austrian Parliament responded on 3 April with the Habsburg Law, which dethroned and banished the Habsburgs. Charles was barred from ever returning to Austria. Other male Habsburgs could only return if they renounced all intentions of reclaiming the defunct throne and accepted the status of ordinary citizens. Another law passed on the same day abolished all nobility in Austria. In Switzerland, Charles and his family briefly took residence at Castle Wartegg near Rorschach at Lake Constance, and later moved to Château de Prangins at Lake Geneva on 20 May.

Attempts to reclaim throne of Hungary

Following the restoration of the Kingdom of Hungary, encouraged by Hungarian royalists ("legitimists"), Charles sought twice in 1921 to reclaim the throne of Hungary, but failed largely because Hungary's regent, Admiral Miklós Horthy (the last commander of the Imperial and Royal Navy), refused to support Charles's restoration. Horthy's action was declared "treasonous" by royalists. Critics suggest that Horthy's actions were more firmly grounded in political reality than those of Charles and his supporters. Indeed, neighbouring countries had threatened to invade Hungary if Charles tried to regain the throne. Later in 1921, the Hungarian parliament formally nullified the Pragmatic Sanction, an act that effectively dethroned the Habsburgs in Hungary.

Exile in Madeira, Portugal, and death

After the second failed attempt at restoration in Hungary, Charles and his pregnant wife Zita were arrested and quarantined at Tihany Abbey. Determined to prevent a third restoration attempt, the Council of Allied Powers decided on his exile. On 1 November 1921 they were transported down the Danube aboard the gunboat HMS Glowworm, across the Black Sea on the cruiser , and on 19 November 1921 they arrived at their final exile, the isolated, heavily guarded Portuguese island of Madeira.

The couple and their children, who joined them on 2 February 1922, lived first at Funchal at the Villa Vittoria, next to Reid's Hotel, and later moved to a modest residence in Quinta do Monte.

Charles never left Madeira. On 9 March 1922 he caught a cold in town, which developed into bronchitis and progressed to severe pneumonia. Having suffered two heart attacks, he died of respiratory failure on 1 April, in the presence of his wife (who was pregnant with their eighth child) and nine-year-old former Crown Prince Otto, remaining conscious almost until his last moments. His last words to his wife were "I love you so much." He was 34 years old. His remains except for his heart are still on the island, resting in state in a chapel devoted to the Emperor in the Portuguese Church of Our Lady of the Mount, in spite of several attempts to move them to the Habsburg Crypt in Vienna. His heart and the heart of his wife are entombed in Muri Abbey, Switzerland.

Legacy

Historians have been mixed in their evaluations of Charles and his reign. In the interwar period, he was celebrated in Austria as a military hero. When Nazi Germany took over it made his memory into that of a traitor. For decades after 1945, both popular and academic interest practically disappeared, but attention has slowly returned.

Helmut Rumpler, the head of the Habsburg commission of the Austrian Academy of Sciences, described Charles as "a dilettante, far too weak for the challenges facing him, out of his depth, and not really a politician." Others have seen Charles as a brave and honourable figure who tried to stop the war in which his Empire was drowning.
Anatole France, the French novelist, stated: 
This war without end is criminal. What is abominable is that they do not want to end it. No, they do not want. Do not try to tell me that there was no way to end it. Emperor Charles offered peace; he is the only decent man to have appeared in this war, and he was not listened to. There was, through him, a chance that could have been seized... Clemenceau called the emperor a "rotten conscience," it's ignoble. Emperor Charles sincerely wanted peace, and therefore was despised by the whole world. [...] A king of France, yes a king, would have had pity on our poor, exhausted, bloodlet nation. However democracy is without a heart and without entrails. When serving the powers of money, it is pitiless and inhuman.

Paul von Hindenburg, the German commander in chief, commented in his memoirs:He tried to compensate for the evaporation of the ethical power which emperor Franz Joseph had represented by offering völkisch reconciliation. Even as he dealt with elements who were sworn to the goal of destroying his empire he believed that his acts of political grace would affect their conscience. These attempts were totally futile; those people had long ago lined up with our common enemies, and were far from being deterred.

Beatification

Catholic Church leaders have praised Charles for putting his Christian faith first in making political decisions, and for his role as a peacemaker during the war, especially after 1917. 

The cause or campaign for his canonization began in 1949. In 1954, the cause was opened and Charles was declared "servant of God", the first step in the process. At the beginning of the cause for canonization in 1972 his tomb was opened and his body was discovered to be incorrupt.

On 14 April 2003, the Vatican's Congregation for the Causes of Saints, in the presence of Pope John Paul II, promulgated Charles of Austria's "heroic virtues". Charles thereby acquired the title "venerable". On 21 December 2003, the Congregation certified, on the basis of three expert medical opinions, that a miracle in 1960 occurred through the intercession of Charles. The miracle attributed to Charles was the scientifically inexplicable healing of a Brazilian nun with debilitating varicose veins; she was able to get out of bed after she prayed for his beatification.

Pope John Paul II declared Charles "Blessed" in a beatification ceremony in St. Peter's Square on 3 October 2004. The Pope also declared 21 October, the date of Charles's marriage in 1911 to Princess Zita, to be Charles's feast day. At the ceremony, the Pope stated:

The main points of Pope Benedict XV's peace plan were:  (1) the moral force of right ... be substituted for the material force of arms, (2) there must be simultaneous and reciprocal diminution of armaments, (3) a mechanism for international arbitration must be established, (4) true liberty and common rights over the sea should exist, (5) there should be a renunciation of war indemnities, (6) occupied territories should be evacuated, and (7) there should be an examination of rival claims. The best outcome to the war, according to Pope Benedict XV, was an immediate restoration of the status quo without reparations or any form of forced demands.  Although the plan seemed unattainable due to the severity of the war thus far, it appealed to Charles, perhaps as a way to fulfill and preserve his role as Catholic Emperor of Austria and Apostolic King of Hungary. The beatification nevertheless raised controversy over Charles's alleged authorisation of the Austro-Hungarian Army's use of poison gas during World War I.

From the beginning, Emperor Charles conceived of his office as a holy service to his people. His chief concern was to follow the Christian vocation to holiness also in his political actions. For this reason, his thoughts turned to social assistance.

On 31 January 2008, after a 16-month investigation, a Church tribunal recognized a second miracle attributed to Charles I. A "devout Baptist" from Orlando, Florida was allegedly cured after several recent converts to Roman Catholicism in Louisiana prayed for Charles's intercession.

In 2011, the League of Prayers for the promotion of Charles's cause set up a website, and Cardinal Christoph Schönborn of Vienna has sponsored the cause. One of Charles's granddaughters, Princess Maria-Anna Galitzine, has been a prominent figure in the campaign for sainthood.

Quotes

 "Now, we must help each other to get to Heaven." Addressing Empress Zita on 22 October 1911, the day after their wedding.
 "I am an officer with all my body and soul, but I do not see how anyone who sees his dearest relations leaving for the front can love war." Addressing Empress Zita after the outbreak of World War I.
 "I have done my duty, as I came here to do. As crowned King, I not only have a right, I also have a duty. I must uphold the right, the dignity and honor of the Crown.... For me, this is not something light. With the last breath of my life I must take the path of duty. Whatever I regret, Our Lord and Savior has led me." Addressing Cardinal János Csernoch after the defeat of his attempt to regain the Hungarian throne in 1921. 
 "I must suffer like this so my people will come together again." Spoken in Madeira, during his last illness.
 "I can't go on much longer... Thy will be done... Yes... Yes... As you will it... Jesus!" Reciting his last words while contemplating a crucifix held by Empress Zita.

Titles, styles, honours and arms

Titles and styles
 17 August 1887 – 28 June 1914: His Imperial and Royal Highness Archduke Charles of Austria, Prince of Hungary, Bohemia and Croatia
 28 June 1914 – 21 November 1916: His Imperial and Royal Highness The Archduke of Austria-Este
 21 November 1916 – 3 April 1919: His Imperial and Royal Apostolic Majesty The Emperor of Austria, Apostolic King of Hungary and Croatia, Slavonia and Dalmatia

Honours

Postage stamp 
 Issued by Hungary on 30 December 1916

Children
Charles and Princess Zita of Bourbon-Parma had eight children together.

Ancestry

See also
 List of heirs to the Austrian throne

Notes

Further reading
 
 G. Brook-Shepherd, The Last Empress: The Life & Times of Zita of Austria-Hungary, 1892–1989, 1991. .
 Coulombe, Charles, Blessed Charles of Austria: A Holy Emperor and His Legacy, (TAN Books, 2020). 
 Hopwood, Robert F. "The Conflict between Count Czernin and Emperor Charles in 1918." Austrian History Yearbook 4 (1968): 28–43.
 Mason, John W. The Dissolution of the Austro-Hungarian Empire, 1867-1918 (Routledge, 2014).
 Valiani, Leo. The End of Austria-Hungary (London: Secker & Warburg, 1973).

 Wawro, Geoffrey. A Mad Catastrophe: The Outbreak of World War I and the Collapse of the Habsburg Empire (2015).
  Bernhard A. Macek, Kaiser Karl I. Der letzte Kaiser Österreichs. Ein biografischer Bilderbogen, Sutton Erfurt, 2012. .
  Flavia Foradini, Otto d'Asburgo. L'ultimo atto di una dinastia, mgs press, Trieste: 2004. .

External links

 Blessed Emperor Charles League of Prayers
 Robert Rill: Charles I, Emperor of Austria, in: 1914-1918-online. International Encyclopedia of the First World War.
 

 
1887 births
1922 deaths
20th-century Emperors of Austria
Grand Crosses of the Order of Saint Stephen of Hungary
20th-century venerated Christians
Anti-Masonry
Austria-Este
Austrian anti-communists
Austrian beatified people
Austrian exiles
Austrian expatriates in Portugal
Austrian Roman Catholics
Beatifications by Pope John Paul II
Burials in Madeira Island
Burials in Switzerland
Charles University alumni
Honorary Knights Grand Cross of the Royal Victorian Order
Grand Crosses of the Military Order of Max Joseph
Grand Masters of the Order of the Golden Fleece
Field marshals of Austria
Field marshals of Germany
House of Habsburg-Lorraine
Hungarian anti-communists
Hungarian Roman Catholics
Knights of the Golden Fleece of Austria
Grand Crosses of the Military Order of Maria Theresa
Knights of Malta
People from Persenbeug-Gottsdorf
Roman Catholic royal saints
Recipients of the Order of Franz Joseph
Recipients of the Iron Cross (1914), 1st class
Recipients of the Pour le Mérite (military class)
Recipients of the Order of Bravery, 2nd class
Venerated Catholics by Pope John Paul II
Austrian monarchists
Archdukes of Austria
Deaths from pneumonia in Portugal
Deaths from respiratory failure
Dethroned monarchs
Dukes of Carniola